Cyperus splendens is a species of sedge that is native to eastern parts of Madagascar.

See also 
 List of Cyperus species

References 

splendens
Plants described in 1936
Flora of Mozambique
Taxa named by Georg Kükenthal